Jørnfjorden is a fjord in Bø Municipality in Nordland county, Norway. The inlet to the ford lies between the villages of Straumsnes to the west and Guvåg to the east. The fjord reaches a depth of  just northeast of the small village of Auvåg.

The village of Auvåg lies on the west side of the fjord slightly past the inlet, and the village of Røsnes lies on the opposite shore, to the east. Immediately north of Auvåg there are two bays, Nordvåg and Langfjord. A small fjord arm further into the fjord, to the northeast, is named Kvernfjord. The village of Klakksjorda lies on the  other side, along an arm of the fjord named Vestfjord.
 
County Road 913 runs along the entire east side of the fjord.

References

External links
Jørnfjord at Norgeskart

Bø, Nordland
Vesterålen
Fjords of Nordland